Roger von Norman (1908  2000) was a Hungarian-born German film editor and director.

Selected filmography

Editor
 Wrong Number, Miss (1932)
 Manolescu, Prince of Thieves (1933)
 The Tsarevich (1933)
 The Page from the Dalmasse Hotel (1933)
 The Big Chance (1934)
 The Voice of Love (1934)
 The Blonde Carmen (1935)
 The Student of Prague (1935)
 The Czar's Courier (1936)
 Togger (1937)
 Dangerous Crossing (1937)

Director
 Sky Hounds (1942)
 Derby (1949)

References

Bibliography
 Richards, Jeffrey. Visions of Yesterday. Routledge & Kegan Paul, 1973.

External links

1908 births
2000 deaths
German film directors
Hungarian emigrants to Germany
German film editors